The Zeros may refer to:

 The Zeros (American band), a San Diego punk rock band formed in 1976
 The Zeros (American glam punk band), a Los Angeles band 1982–1997
 The Zeros (English band), a punk rock band formed in 1977
 The Zeros (film), an American film of 2001

See also
 2000s (decade), the decade from 2000 through 2009
 Zero (disambiguation)